Andrea Salerno (born May 3, 1991), known professionally as Andrea Denver, is an Italian fashion model based in New York City. He is signed in 2014 to Wilhelmina Miami, Wilhelmina Los Angeles and Soul Management Artist New York.

Early life
Denver was born in Verona, Italy, in 1991 as Andrea Salerno. He studied for a degree in Communication Science at the University of Verona, graduating in 2013. Denver has a degree in communication from the University of Verona.

In 2014, he moved to the United States to study for a master's degree in communication. While in Miami, he was first scouted and signed by Wilhelmina Models. He garnered attention after featuring in Jennifer Lopez's "I Luh Ya Papi" and Taylor Swift's "Blank Space", and following rumors of a relationship with pop singer Madonna.

In September 2019 he appeared in the British Television series The Circle on Channel 4 as a potential contestant during Episode 16.

He appeared in the first season of Winter House, which premiered on October 20, 2021, and had a total of 6 episodes. He also appeared in the sixth season of Summer House, which premiered on January 17, 2022, and had a total of 17 episodes.

Personal life
Between 2015 and 2018, he was nominated four consecutive times in "The Model of the Year Award - Social Media Star Men" on Models.com.

Modeling career
Denver has featured in campaigns for Hugo Boss, MAC Cosmetics, Brooks Brothers, as well as Colcci. He has featured on the covers and editorials of  Men's Health Serbia, Lui, L'Officiel Hommes, FourTwoNine, Paper, Risbel, Jon magazine, Adon magazine, Velvet, and Lewis Magazine. He has runway modeled for brands Ralph Lauren and 2xist. He has also worked with fashion industry photographers Collier Schorr, Craig McDean, Rick Day, Arnaldo Anaya-Lucca, Yuri Catania and Brent Chua.

Denver was featured in the music video for Jennifer Lopez's "I Luh Ya Papi", as well as the music video for Taylor Swift's "Blank Space".

Filmography 
 The Circle (Channel 4, 2019), Contestant
 Grande Fratello VIP (Canale 5, 2020), Contestant
 Winter House Season 1 - Bravo TV 2021, Main cast - 6 episodes
 Summer House Season 6 - Bravo TV 2022, Main cast - 17 episodes 
 Family Feud - ABC TV, August 2022, Contestant - Episode 806, August 14, 2022

References 

1991 births
Italian expatriates in the United States
Italian male models
Models from New York City
Living people
People from Verona
University of Verona alumni